Cassie Grzymkowski (born March 17, 1986), better known by her stage name Cassie Ramone, is an American musician and artist. Ramone rose to prominence as the guitarist and vocalist of indie rock band Vivian Girls, who broke up in 2014, and later reformed in 2019. She also formed the band project The Babies with Kevin Morby (of Woods). During The Babies' hiatus, Ramone embarked on a solo career, releasing her debut album The Time Has Come in August 2014.

Biography
Born and raised in Ridgewood, New Jersey, Ramone attended Ridgewood High School, where she met her later bandmate Katy Goodman. In 2004, she moved to Brooklyn and began studying at Pratt Institute.

Ramone formed the band Bossy along with Jamie Ewing and Justin Sullivan, that lasted until 2007. The same year, she co-found the indie rock band Vivian Girls with Goodman and Frankie Rose. They released three albums, Vivian Girls (2008), Everything Goes Wrong (2009) and Share the Joy (2011), before breaking up in 2014. In 2019, the band reformed and released their fourth album, Memory. After meeting Kevin Morby of Woods, they started a side project called The Babies who released albums in 2011 and 2012.

In 2014, Ramone embarked a solo career and released her debut album The Time Has Come, featuring Ariel Pink on bass. In early 2015, she formed Melt, who only conceived a demo. She also formed another band with Dee Dee from Dum Dum Girls and OJ from XRay Eyeballs called OCDPP. They debuted as a live act in 2015 and released an EP called 7" Long Player in 2020.

Ramone released a Christmas album titled Christmas in Reno on December 11, 2015.

Art
Apart from music, Ramone is an artist who designed the cover art for most of the Vivian Girls and The Babies' discography, and La Sera's La Sera (2011). She also does drawings, paintings, sculptures and collages that uploads in her Flickr account.

Influences
Ramone cites Neil Young, The Wipers, Burt Bacharach, The Shangri-las, Rush, The Bananas, The Ramones, Johnny Horton, The Carpenters, Dead Moon and Elliott Smith among her favorite artists.

Discography

Solo artist

Studio albums

Split singles

Album appearances

with Bossy
The Best of Bossy (2009)

with Vivian Girls
Vivian Girls (2008)
Everything Goes Wrong (2009)
Share the Joy (2011)
Memory (2019)

with The Babies
 The Babies (2011)
 Our House on the Hill (2012)

References

External links

1986 births
21st-century American singers
American rock guitarists
American women rock singers
American rock songwriters
American women singer-songwriters
American indie rock musicians
Singer-songwriters from New Jersey
Living people
21st-century American guitarists
Guitarists from New Jersey
People from Ridgewood, New Jersey
Ridgewood High School (New Jersey) alumni
21st-century American women singers
21st-century American women guitarists